Abbeycwmhir or Abbey Cwmhir ("Abbey in the Long Valley") is a village and community in the valley of the Nant Clywedog in Radnorshire, Powys, Wales. The community includes the hamlet of Bwlch-y-sarnau.

The Abbey 

The village is named after Cwmhir Abbey, the Cistercian abbey built there in 1143. It was the largest Abbey in Wales, but was never completed. Its fourteen bay nave was longer than Canterbury and Salisbury Cathedral naves and twice as long as that at St. Davids. It was a daughter house of Whitland Abbey, and constructed at the behest of three sons of Madog, the then Prince of southern Powys. The first community at Dyvanner ("Manor House") failed because of the intervention of Hugh de Mortimer, Earl of Hereford but in 1176 the Rhys ap Gruffydd of Deheubarth re-established the Abbey on land given by Cadwallon ap Madog. Llywelyn ap Gruffudd is buried near the altar in the nave. The abbey was burned by the forces of Owain Glyndŵr in 1401. At the dissolution of the monasteries in March 1537 only three monks lived in the abbey.

The Abbey was slighted in 1644, during the English Civil War, although some ruins still remain.  There is a memorial stone to Llywelyn ap Gruffudd, the last native Prince of Wales of direct descent, whose body is buried there.

Places of note 

 The village church of St Mary was rebuilt in the Neo-Byzantine style by Mary Beatrice Philips in 1866. She was a grand daughter of Francis Philips, who purchased the Abbeycwmhir estate in 1837 with money from the cotton trade. It replaced a church built in 1680.  Soon after the Victorian church was built, the Francis Kilvert visited.
 The Happy Union Inn is a Grade II listed building. The age of the building is unknown. The present owner is the 3rd generation of his family to run the pub.
 Abbey Cwmhir Hall is a Georgian style house built in 1833 by Thomas Wilson, a London lawyer who had purchased the 3000 acre Abbeycwmhir estate. It is open to the public.

See also 
Glyndŵr's Way

References

External links 
 Village website

Communities in Powys
Villages in Powys
Burial sites of the House of Aberffraw